Funeral For a Feeling is the second full-length studio album from New York City hardcore punk band Kill Your Idols. It was released on July 17th, 2001 on SideOneDummy Records.

Track listing
"Madly" 	– 2:35  	   
"Young (at Heart)" 	– 2:03 	
"The Seen" 	– 1:01 	
"Funeral for a Feeling" 	– 1:53 	
"By the Way" 	– 0:38 	
"A Better Place" 	– 1:47 		
"All the Difference" 	– 1:17 		
"This Is Not Goodbye, Just Goodnight" 	– 2:25 		
"With Blinders On" 	– 1:50 		
"Dead by Dawn" 	– 2:07 		
"Made to Be Broken" (Poison Idea)	– 2:55 		
"Last Song" 	– 1:45 		
"Fall Out" 	– 1:42 		
"All That and Vans Too!" 	– 2:03 		
"I Will Defy" 	– 2:25 		
"Fashion Statement" 	– 2:01 		
"Goodbye My Love, Hello My Friend" 	– 4:13

Personnel
 Andy West – vocals
 Gary Bennett – guitar
 Brian Meehan – guitar
 Paul Delaney – bass
 Raeph Glicken – drums
 Recorded May 6 – 13, 2001
 Produced by Kill Your Idols
 Engineered by Arik Victor and Mike Bardzik

References

External links 
 SideOneDummy Records band and album page

2001 albums
Kill Your Idols albums